10 Tauri is a single star in the zodiac constellation of Taurus. It can be seen with the naked eye, having an apparent visual magnitude of 4.29. An annual parallax shift of 71.62 mas provides a distance estimate of 45.5 light years. It is moving further from the Sun with a radial velocity of +28 km/s and has a relatively high proper motion.

The star has a stellar classification of F8 V, indicating that it is an ordinary F-type main-sequence star that is generating energy through hydrogen fusion in its core region. It is around 5.7 billion years old with a rotation period of 17.6 days. The star has 1.14 times the mass of the Sun and 1.6 times the Sun's radius. It is radiating three times the Sun's luminosity from its photosphere at an effective temperature of around 5,997 K.

A debris disk has been identified orbiting 10 Tauri, based on excess infrared radiation detected by IRAS/ISO.

10 Tauri was the brightest star in the obsolete constellation Psalterium Georgii (Harpa Georgii).

References

External links
 
 
 

F-type main-sequence stars
Tauri, 010
Tauri, 010
Taurus (constellation)
BD-00 0572
0147
022484
016852
1101